Vaina may refer to:

Vaina (surname)
Vaina, Uttar Pradesh,  village  in Khair municipality of Aligarh district in Uttar Pradesh, India
Väina, Estonian name of Daugava river
, traditional Chilean cocktail

See also